The Taiyuan Satellite Launch Center (TSLC) also known as Base 25, is a People's Republic of China space and defense launch facility (spaceport). It is situated in Kelan County, Xinzhou, Shanxi Province and is the second of four launch sites having been founded in March 1966 and coming into full operation in 1968. Taiyuan sits at an altitude of 1500 meters and its dry climate makes it an ideal launch site. The site is primarily used to launch meteorological satellites, Earth resource satellites and scientific satellites on Long March launch vehicles into Sun-synchronous orbits. TSLC is also a major launch site for intercontinental ballistic missiles and overland submarine-launched ballistic missile (SLBM) tests.

The site has a sophisticated Technical Center and Mission Command and Control Center. It is served by two feeder railways that connect with the Ningwu–Kelan railway.

Launch pads

 Launch Site 7: CZ-1D, CZ-2C/SD, CZ-4A, CZ-4B and CZ-4C vehicles.
 Launch Site 9: CZ-2C, CZ-2D, CZ-4B and CZ-4C. First use on 25 October 2008.
 Launch Site 16: CZ-6 and Kuaizhou-1A.
 Launch Site 9A: CZ-6A.

Recent launches

Taiyuan Satellite Launch Center was to launch a satellite coded as the 03 Group of the Shijian-6 serial research satellites sometime on 24 October 2008. The rocket carrier was to be a Long March 4B, said the official, noting both the satellite and the rocket were in good condition and all the preparations for the launch had been completed.

See also
 Space program of China
 Jiuquan Satellite Launch Center
 Xichang Satellite Launch Center
 Wenchang Satellite Launch Center

References

Buildings and structures in Shanxi
Chinese space program facilities
Spaceports in China